USC&GS Eagre was a survey ship of the U.S. Coast and Geodetic Survey, originally the yacht Mohawk, which later served in the United States Navy as USS Eagre.

Ship history

The schooner-yacht Mohawk  was launched from J. B. Van Deusen's shipyard in Williamsburg, Brooklyn for the millionaire cotton merchant William T. Garner. She was called the "biggist yacht in the world." At  she was the largest racing yacht of her generation. Garner, his wife, and all but 2 passengers and 1 crewman were lost when the yacht capsized in a squall during her maiden voyage in New York Harbor on 20 July 1876 off Stapleton, Staten Island. Mohawk was later raised at a cost of $25,000, and bought for the Coast Survey and renamed Eagre,
taking its name from a term for a tidal bore, which is in turn derived from Ægir the Norse god of the sea.

In 1890 Eagre was part of a squadron of ships under the command of Lieutenant E.M. Hughes making the first systematic survey of the hazardous Nantucket Shoals along with the steamer  as flagship, the schooner Scoresby and the steam tender Daisy.

These duties terminated in late 1906, and she remained at Norfolk until approved for use as a houseboat for enlisted men who were attached to the Norfolk Navy Yard. She was stricken on 10 September 1910 and sold.

References

External links
 NOAA History, Coast and Geodetic Survey Ships: EAGRE 
 NOAA photo library : Coast and Geodetic Survey Schooner Eagre

1875 ships
Maritime incidents in July 1876
Ships built in Brooklyn
Ships of the United States Coast Survey
Ships of the United States Coast and Geodetic Survey
Schooners of the United States Navy